In the Ceiling the Stars Are Shining (orig. Swedish I taket lyser stjärnorna, literal translation) is a Swedish novel by Johanna Thydell, published in 2003. The book is about thirteen-year-old Jenna Wilson, who is unpopular at school and whose mother is dying of breast cancer. The book won the prestigious August Prize as the best Swedish children's and youth's book of 2003.

A film adaptation, Glowing Stars, was released in 2009.

References

2003 children's books
Swedish children's novels
August Prize-winning works
Swedish-language novels
Swedish novels adapted into films
2003 Swedish novels
Novels about cancer
Natur & Kultur books